Hiromi Endō (born 22 February 1993) is a Japanese judoka.

She is the gold medallist of the 2013 Judo World Masters in the -48 kg category.

References

External links
 

1993 births
Living people
Japanese female judoka
21st-century Japanese women